The Dewey Square Group (DSG) is a political consulting firm based in Washington, D.C. The company was initially started in 1992 by political strategists Charlie Baker, Chuck Campion and Michael Whouley, and headquartered in Boston. In 2005, DSG had unaudited revenues of $12.5 million and gross assets of $2.9 million. In August 2006, it was bought by the WPP Group.

History
The Dewey Square Group was founded in 1992 by Charlie Baker, Chuck Campion and Michael Whouley. Whouley served as the field director for President Bill Clinton's 1992 presidential campaign.

Clients
Clients include lyft, McDonald's, MGM Springfield, Sony Pictures, the Special Olympics and the Ultimate Fighting Championship.

References

External links
Dewey Square Group website

Advocacy groups in the United States
Public relations companies of the United States
Lobbying firms based in Washington, D.C.
American companies established in 1992